The Autumn Stakes is a Melbourne Racing Club Group 2 Thoroughbred horse race for three-year-olds, at set weights with penalties, over a distance of 1400 metres at Caulfield Racecourse, Melbourne, Australia run in February. Total prizemoney for the race is A$300,000.

History

Name
1979–1990 - Autumn Stakes
1991 - Tattersall's Stakes
1992–1995 - Autumn Stakes
1996–1997 - Japan Racing Association Autumn Stakes
1998–2001 - Autumn Stakes
2002 - Australia Day Vase
2003–2004 - Autumn Stakes
2005–2007 - Schweppervescence Cup
2008 - Perri Cutten Cup
2009–2011 - D'Urban Stakes
2012 onwards - Autumn Stakes

Distance
1979–1986 – 1200 metres
1987 onwards - 1400 metres

Grade
1968–1978 - Unlisted race
1979 - Listed race
1980–2007 - Group 3
2008 onwards - Group 2

Venue
1966–1985 - Sandown Racecourse
1986 - Caulfield Racecourse 
1987–1996 - Sandown Racecourse
1997–2022 - Caulfield Racecourse
2023 - Sandown Racecourse

Winners

 2023 – Glint of Silver 
 2022 – Coastwatch 
 2021 – Poland 
 2020 – Microphone 
 2019 – Hawkshot
 2018 – Holy Snow
 2017 – Oak Door
 2016 – Mahuta
 2015 – San Nicasio		
 2014 – Thunder Fantasy
 2013 – Mulaazem
 2012 – Pied A Terre
 2011 – Dusty Star
 2010 – Denman
 2009 – Fravashi
 2008 – Light Fantastic
 2007 – Catechuchu
 2006 – Apache Cat
 2005 – Shinzig
 2004 – Special Harmony
 2003 – Titanic Jack
 2002 – Dash For Cash
 2001 – Desert Sky
 2000 – Sudurka
 1999 – Dignity Dancer
 1998 – Blaze The Turf
 1997 – Tampir Lane
 1996 – Nick On The Run
 1995 – St Covet
 1994 – Royal Rubiton
 1993 – Just Juan
 1992 – Laranto
 1991 – Canny Lad
 1990 – The Oval
 1989 – King's High
 1988 – Havelock's Pride
 1987 – Northern Copy
 1986 – Beach Gown
 1985 – Testimony
 1984 – Centaine
 1983 – Lord Ballina
 1982 – Pure Of Heart
 1981 – Deck The Halls
 1980 – Tolhurst
 1979 – Gondolier

See also
 List of Australian Group races
 Group races

References

Horse races in Australia
Flat horse races for three-year-olds
Caulfield Racecourse